Gymnocarpium is a small genus of ferns, called oak ferns. It was once placed with various other groups, including the dryopteroid ferns and the athyrioid ferns.  Cladistic analysis has demonstrated that Gymnocarpium and Cystopteris form a natural but relatively primitive clade that is basal to the asplenioid, thelypterioid, and athyrioid ferns comprehensively.

Gymnocarpium sori are small, round and naked.  These ferns generally have a slender, creeping rhizome under the surface of the ground, and fairly thin-textured fronds.

Gymnocarpium species
Gymnocarpium appalachianum – Appalachian oak fern
Gymnocarpium brittonianum
Gymnocarpium dryopteris – (northern) oak fern
Gymnocarpium fedtschenkoanum
Gymnocarpium disjunctum
Gymnocarpium jessoense – western or Nahanni oak fern
Gymnocarpium oyamense
Gymnocarpium remotepinnatum
Gymnocarpium robertianum – limestone oak fern

External links
 Gymnocarpium world species list 

 
Fern genera
Taxa named by Edward Newman